Rav is the Hebrew word for rabbi.

Rav, RAV, or R.A.V. may also refer to:

Places
 Rav, Kutch, a village in Rapar Taluka of Kutch district of Gujarat, India

People
 Rav, a common name for Abba Arika (175–247), Jewish Talmudist

Brands and enterprises
 90.7 RAV FM, the on-air brand of CFU758, a low-power radio station in Thornhill, Ontario
 Reliable AntiVirus, a core technology of Windows Live OneCare
 Toyota RAV4, an automobile

Transport
 RAV, the IATA code for Cravo Norte Airport, an airport in Colombia
 RAV, Ravenglass railway station's National Rail station code
 RAV Line, the working name for the Canada Line, a rapid transit line Metro Vancouver, British Columbia

Other uses
 R.A.V. v. City of St. Paul 505 U.S. 377 (1992), a United States Supreme Court case involving freedom of speech
 Rav Aluf, the highest aluf rank in the Israel Defense Forces
 Reweighted approval voting, an alternative name for sequential proportional approval voting